Zamzam, officially the National Congress Party, is a moderate Islamist political party in Jordan which was established in 2016 by the Zamzam initiative members, who have defected from the Jordanian Muslim Brotherhood. The party won 5 seats in the 2016 general elections.

References

Jordanian democracy movements
2016 establishments in Jordan
Islamic political parties
Political parties established in 2016
Political parties in Jordan